Janay Harding (born September 28, 1994) is a New Zealand mixed martial artist who competes in the Featherweight division of the Bellator MMA. As of February 28, 2023, she is #7 in the Bellator Women's Featherweight Rankings.

Background
Harding was born in Christchurch, New Zealand but moved to Australia's Gold Coast at the age of ten when her father, Geoffrey Charlton, passed away. Starting martial arts at a young age, Harding earned a black belt in karate at the age of 14.

Mixed martial arts career

Early career
Harding started her professional MMA career in 2014, compiled a 3-2 record, though the two losses on her professional record came against current UFC fighter Jessica-Rose Clark and previous Bellator title challenger Arlene Blencowe, while also losing to Megan Anderson in an amateur bout. Harding made her international debut in May 2017, travelling to Hong Kong where she secured a second round stoppage over Ramona Pascual.

Bellator MMA
Signing with Bellator MMA in December 2017, Harding made her promotional debut against Amber Leibrock at Bellator 199 on May 12, 2018. She lost the bout via unanimous decision.

Harding faced Sinead Kavanagh at Bellator 207 on October 12, 2018. She won the bout after it was stopped due to a cut.

Harding faced Marina Mokhnatkina on March 29, 2019 at Bellator 219. She won the bout via unanimous decision.

Harding faced Amanda Bell at Bellator 233 on November 8, 2019. She lost the fight via third-round knockout.

Harding faced Jessy Miele at Bellator 251 on November 5, 2020. She won the bout via unanimous decision.

Harding faced Leah McCourt on May 21, 2021 at Bellator 259. At the weigh-ins, McCourt weighed in at 149.4 pounds, three and a half pounds over the featherweight non-title fight limit. The bout proceeded at catchweight and McCourt was fined a percentage of her purse, which went to Harding. After looking dominant in the second round with her striking, Harding was caught with an upkick while trying to pass McCourt's guard and fell into a triangle choke, losing the bout via submission.

Harding faced Dayana Silva on April 23, 2022 at Bellator 279. She lost the bout via unanimous decision.

Harding faced Sinead Kavanagh in a rematch on February 25, 2023 at Bellator 291. She lost the fight by unanimous decision.

Boxing 
Harding faced Tayla Harris for the vacant Australian female super-welterweight title at The Melbourne Pavilion on November 22, 2019. She lost the bout via TKO in the 4th round.

Mixed martial arts record

|-
|Loss
|align=center| 6–7
|Sinead Kavanagh
|Decision (unanimous)
|Bellator 291
|
|align=center|3
|align=center|5:00
|Dublin, Ireland
|
|-
|Loss
|align=center| 6–6
| Dayana Silva
|Decision (unanimous)
| Bellator 279
| 
|align=center|3
|align=center|5:00
| Honolulu, Hawaii, United States
| 
|-
|Loss
|align=center| 6–5
|Leah McCourt
|Submission (triangle choke)
|Bellator 259 
|
|align=center|2
|align=center|2:42
|Uncasville, Connecticut, United States
|
|-
| Win
| align=center| 6–4
| Jessy Miele
|  Decision (unanimous)
| Bellator 251
| 
| align=center| 3
| align=center| 5:00
| Uncasville, Connecticut, United States
| 
|-
| Loss
| align=center| 5–4
| Amanda Bell
|TKO (punches)
|Bellator 233
|
|align=center| 3
|align=center| 4:44
|Thackerville, Oklahoma, United States
|
|-
| Win
| align=center| 5–3
| Marina Mokhnatkina
| Decision (unanimous)
| Bellator 219
| 
| align=center| 3
| align=center| 5:00
| Temecula, California, United States
|
|-
| Win
| align=center|4–3
| Sinead Kavanagh
|TKO (cut)
| Bellator 207
| 
| align=center|1
| align=center|5:00
| Uncasville, Connecticut, United States
|
|-
| Loss
| align=center| 3–3
| Amber Leibrock
| Decision (unanimous)
| Bellator 199
| 
| align=center|3
| align=center|5:00
| San Jose, California
| 
|-
| Win
| align=center| 3–2
| Ramona Pascual
| TKO (elbows and punches)
| Fight Factory Gym: E-1 World Championship
|
|align=Center|2
|align=center|1:43
|Hong Kong
| 
|-
| Loss
| align=center| 2–2
| Arlene Blencowe
|KO (punches)
|Legend MMA 1
|
|align=center|1
|align=center|1:08
|Gold Coast, Queensland Australia
| 
|-
| Loss
| align=center| 2–1
| Jessica-Rose Clark
|Decision (unanimous)
|Eternal MMA 19
|
|align=center|3
|align=center|5:00
|Gold Coast, Queensland, Australia
| 
|-
| Win
| align=center| 2–0
| Jess Doueihi
| TKO (punches)
| Brace 36
| 
| align=center| 1
| align=center| 1:26
| Sydney, New South Wales, Australia
| 
|-
| Win
| align=center| 1–0
| Helen Malone
| TKO (punches)
| Eternal MMA 5
| 
| align=center| 1
| align=center| 1:59
| Gold Coast, Queensland, Australia
|
|-

See also 
 List of current Bellator fighters
 List of female mixed martial artists

References

External links 
  
 

1994 births
Living people
New Zealand female mixed martial artists
Featherweight mixed martial artists
Mixed martial artists utilizing karate
Mixed martial artists utilizing boxing
Mixed martial artists from the Gold Coast
Bellator female fighters
New Zealand female karateka
New Zealand women boxers
Sportspeople from Christchurch